Chymotrypsin-like elastase family member 1 (CELA1) also known as elastase-1 (ELA1) is an enzyme that in humans is encoded by the CELA1 gene. Elastases form a subfamily of serine proteases that hydrolyze many proteins in addition to elastin. Humans have six elastase genes which encode the structurally similar proteins elastase 1, 2, 2A, 2B, 3A, and 3B.

Tissue distribution 

Elastase-1 was formerly designated pancreatic elastase 1. However unlike other elastases, pancreatic elastase 1 is not expressed in the pancreas. Hence this enzyme has been renamed as elastase-1. To date, elastase 1 expression has only been detected in skin keratinocytes. Literature that describes human elastase 1 activity in the pancreas or fecal material is actually referring to chymotrypsin-like elastase family, member 3B  CELA3B).

Clinical significance 

This enzyme has been linked to chronic pancreatitis .

References

Further reading

External links 
 The MEROPS online database for peptidases and their inhibitors: S01.153
 

EC 3.4.21